Bandopadhyay ( (Bandōpādhyāẏa)) is a Bengali surname. Notable people with the surname include:
Bappaditya Bandopadhyay (born 1970), Indian director and poet
Bhanu Bandopadhyay (1920–1983), Bengali film actor
Bibhutibhushan Bandopadhyay (1894–1950), Bengali novelist and writer
Haradhan Bandopadhyay (1926–2013), Indian Bengali male actor of television and films
Manik Bandopadhyay (1908–1956), one of the founding fathers of modern Bengali fiction
Padmavathy Bandopadhyay (born 1944), the first woman Air Marshal of the Indian Air Force
Sailesh Kumar Bandopadhyay (born 1926), a Gandhian
Sanjoy Bandopadhyay (born 1954), Bengali Hindustani classical sitar player
Subhro Bandopadhyay (born 1978), Bengali poet 
Tarashankar Bandopadhyay (1898–1971), one of the leading Bengali novelists

See also
Banerjee, alternative of surname Bandopadhyay

Bengali-language surnames